Maine Eastern Railroad  was a railroad that operated in coastal Maine, between Brunswick and Rockland, on the former Maine Central Rockland Branch rail line. Maine Eastern passenger trains connected with the Amtrak Downeaster passenger train and Pan Am Railways at Brunswick Maine Street Station. The state of Maine did not renew the operating contract with MERR, which effectively ended operations at the end of 2015.

History
Maine Eastern was a subsidiary of the Morristown & Erie Railway of New Jersey, who won the bid to operate the line in 2003.  MERR provided freight service year-round, and passenger service seasonally between Brunswick and Rockland with former New Haven/Amtrak EMD FL-9 locomotives and stainless steel streamlined passenger cars. Maine Eastern was the successor to Safe Handling Rail, which took over operation of the MaineDOT-owned line when the Maine Coast Railroad chose not to bid on a new contract.  In September 2015, the Maine Department of Transportation selected the Central Maine and Quebec Railway (CMQ) to operate the line beginning on January 1, 2016. In 2020, CMQ would be acquired by Canadian Pacific Railway, which then was absorbed into their rail system.

Commodities moved in freight service include cement, plate steel, and perlite.

In February 2018, the Northern New England Passenger Rail Authority voted to conduct a three-weekend pilot passenger service along the line during the summer. However, Amtrak later announced that this plan would be cancelled due to time constraints in the execution of their risk-assessment plan for the rail line. Despite the cancellation, Amtrak, along with the Northern New England Passenger Rail Authority, Maine Department of Transportation and the Central Maine and & Quebec Railroad, made a test run to Rockland on August 14, 2019.

Rolling stock
The MERR roster consisted of a former Canadian National MLW M-420s numbered 3573, and a RRPX Railroad Power Leasing Electro Motive Division GP9, numbered 764. These two locomotives were used entirely for freight service. For passenger operations, the MERR operated a pair of ex-Amtrak EMD F40PH-2s that still carried their original Amtrak numbers 265 and 291.  These were later replaced with a pair of ex-Amtrak EMD FL-9 locomotives, 488 and 489. Both FL9s were sold so Webb Rail in 2020.

See also

Brunswick Maine Street Station
Rockland Railroad Station

References

Bibliography

External links
  (archived)

 
Railway companies established in 2004
Predecessors of the Canadian Pacific Railway
Railway companies disestablished in 2015

Heritage railroads in Maine
Defunct railroad companies of the United States